Diagoras Dryopideon Aigaleo B.C. (alternate spelling: Egaleo) is a Greek professional basketball team that is located in Aigaleo, Greece, which is a suburb of Athens. It is a part of the multi sports club Athlitikos Syllogos Diagoras Dryopideon Aigaleo (Greek: Αθλητικός Σύλλογος Διαγόρας Δρυοπιδέων Αιγάλεω). Diagoras currently plays in the second-tier level of Greek pro basketball, the Greek A2 Basket League.

History
The club's parent athletic association, A.S. Diagoras Dryopideon Aigaleo (Α.Σ. Διαγόρας Δρυοπιδέων Αιγάλεω) was founded in 1967. The men's basketball section of the club was founded in 1996. After competing for many years in local and regional leagues in Greece, Diagoras Dryopideon played in a Greek national league for the first time, in the 2014–15 season, when the club competed in Greece's national minor league, the Greek 4th Division. 

During the 2016–17 season, Diagoras won the Greek 4th Division's 2nd Group, and thus earned a league promotion to the Greek 3rd Division, for the following 2017–18 season. Diagoras finished second in the Greek 3rd Division's 1st Group, in the 2017–18 season, and thus earned a league promotion to the Greek 2nd Division, for the 2018–19 season. The club also made it to the last 16 stage of the 2018–19 Greek Cup tournament, where they lost to AEK Athens, by a score of 76–54.

In the 2019–20 Greek Cup tournament, Diagoras made it to the semifinals of the Greek Cup, where they again lost to AEK Athens, by a score of 89–71. In the Greek 2nd Division's 2019–20 season, Diagoras finished in second place in the league, behind Charilaos Trikoupis, and earned a league promotion up to the top-tier level Greek Basket League, for the following 2020–21 season. However, Diagoras declined to take their place in the league.

Arena
Diagoras Dryopideon plays its home games at the 2,000 seat Aigaleo Stavros Venetis Indoor Hall.

Season by season

* In the 2019–20 season, Olympiacos B Development Team had the 2nd best record in the Greek A2 Basket League's regular season, at 17–4, but they were deducted a total of 6 points (3 wins) by the Hellenic Basketball Federation. That was due to a punishment of the senior club of Olympiacos, for its forfeiting of several Greek Basket League and Greek Cup games, during the previous 2018–19 season. As a result, Olympiacos B Development Team was placed below Diagoras Dryopideon (16–5 record), in the Greek A2 Basket League's 2019–20 season standings.

Titles and honors

Domestic competitions
Greek 2nd Division
 Runner-up (1): (2020)

Greek 3rd Division
 Runner-up (1): (2018)

Greek 4th Division
 Champion (1): (2017)

Notable players

 Georgios Galiotis
 Vangelis Karampoulas
 Dimitris Katiakos
 Nikos Kokkalis
 Georgios Koukas
 Nikos Liakopoulos
 Kostas Macheras
 Nikos Makris
 Spyros Motsenigos
 Thomas Nikou
 Petros Noeas
 Nikos Persidis
 Christos Petrodimopoulos
 Nikos Pettas
 Michalis Polytarchou

References

External links
Official site 
Eurobasket.com Team Page

Basketball teams established in 1996
Basketball teams in Greece